"New Americana" is a song by American singer and songwriter Halsey from her debut studio album, Badlands (2015). It was released on July 10, 2015 through Astralwerks as the album's second single. It was written by Halsey, Larzz Principato, and Kalkutta, while production was handled by Lido. Described as an alternative pop and electronic pop song, "New Americana" describes the normalization of aspects of counterculture in the United States, including recreational marijuana use and same-sex marriage. The original version of the song was first released on March 31, 2014 via Halsey's official SoundCloud account for streaming and free download.

Composition
"New Americana" is a midtempo alternative pop and electronic pop song that blends electronica and pop. According to the digital sheet music published by Alfred Publishing Co., Inc., the song is composed in the key of C minor with an approximate tempo of 87 BPM and a vocal range of B-C. The track also contains an interpolation of "Juicy Fruit" by Mtume. Halsey's voice is layered on the chorus, similar to Pink Floyd's hit, "Another Brick in the Wall".

In an interview with Oyster, Halsey was asked "How do you deal with the frustration of your work being misunderstood?" They replied:

Halsey has since deemed the track her worst song, elaborating that she got "burnt out" on it. She no longer performs the song live.

Critical reception
The song charted for one week at number 22 on the Bubbling Under Hot 100 before re-entering on the chart six weeks later at number 5, and debuting on the main Hot 100 at number 97 the week following. It has been characterized by several critics, including Billboard, USA Today, and The New York Times, as a "generational anthem" for millennials. Nathan Reese of Pitchfork was unconvinced by the song's lyrics, describing the song as "plasticky" and superficial where it aimed to be inspirational. He concluded reviewing the chorus, finding it "calculated, defiant, and, ultimately, hollow". In June 2017, long after the release of the song, Halsey named it as her worst song released to date. She claimed she was tired of having to always revisit the song.

Music video
On September 25, 2015, the official video premiered on MTV, and was posted on Halsey's Vevo and YouTube accounts shortly after. The video's dystopian setting has been compared to that of The Hunger Games series. The music video featured a single version of "New Americana" in which included different background vocals, a short instrumental before the bridge, and different mixing.

Synopsis
The video opens with an intro of mountain scenery recorded in VHS style with a voice-over of Halsey stating "We were a community. They made me their leader even when I never asked to be. But the lightning in their eyes heralded me to whatever they needed me to become. We were hopeful we would win because nothing could scare us. We feared no city and we feared no man." As the song begins to play, Halsey is then showed joining and being captive with a group of Americans doing unexceptional things. They are then barged in by troops who line them up and take Halsey as hostage since she is presumably the leader of the Americans. She is then dragged to a village where she is tied up to a bonfire. While being poured over with gasoline, Halsey pleads for help but no one responds until immediately before being lit up, when she is then rescued by the Americans. After escaping the troops, Halsey and the Americans are then shown heading out of the forest and running away from the village. The video ends with an instrumental of "Drive" featuring Halsey lying on the ground somewhere similar to the mountains as seen on the opening of the video with a backdrop of a city covered in mist. She is seen wearing a white dystopian outfit and left with nothing but car keys and a radio which she then reaches out to and tries to unravel.

Live performances
In August 2015, Halsey performed "New Americana" at Jimmy Kimmel Live! and again in October 2015 at The Late Show with Stephen Colbert.

Charts

Certifications

true

Release history

References

2015 singles
2015 songs
Astralwerks singles
Capitol Records singles
Halsey (singer) songs
LGBT-related songs
Satirical songs
Songs about cannabis
Songs about the United States
Songs written by James Mtume
Songs written by Halsey (singer)